Vele is a village in the Western region of Maharashtra state in India. It is located in Satara district of Maharashtra. Before it was a part of Bombay State and Princely state of Satara. It is located adjacent to Kanher Dam built on Venna River. There is a big temple of Bhairava at the village entrance. Also there are number of temples in closed vicinity of village.  Surrounded by greenery and farms, agriculture is the main occupation in the village with more than 80% of the total area being used for agricultural activities. Though agriculture constitutes a mainstay of the economy of this village, besides a sizeable population working at various plum government positions does bolster the financial position.

History 
The village was established on banks of Venna River by the Maratha Shinde clan who were hereditary Deshmukh and had received a hereditary Desmukhi Watan Inam of Vele () during the pre-Shivaji era. As per the current available documents Shidoji Shinde was the founder of Shinde family of Vele. Descendants of Shidoji continue to stay in Vele and Satara. Hereditary Administrative rights  of Peteshwar devasthan located near to village on Kaas plateau road belonged to Shinde Deshmukh family.

Demographics

The official language is Marathi () with its own dialect. Language varies in its tone and a few words. People from all castes which include Maratha (), hindu-teli(तेली), Mang, Boudhh, Chambar, Mali, Lohar, Shimpi, Kosthi etc., live here. Maratha comprise the majority of the population. Clan prominent in Vele () is Shinde.

Geography and Climate

Vele () belongs to Desh or Paschim Maharashtra region and to Pune Division . It is located 15 km from district headquarters Satara. Nearby villages are Kamthi, Vennanagar and Kanher.

The climate is tropical monsoons as it receives a heavy rainfall during the monsoon season with the summers being hot and winters being chilly. The average temperature during the winters can range from 9 deg C to 25 deg C.

Education,Infrastructure and Development

Vele () has long tradition for education. It has Marathi High School which was established during British Raj, this was the school where many prominent persons from Vele () took their early education. Presently, village has education facility of both Marathi and Semi-English schools.

Library 
Villagers of Vele(Dnyanganga Sarvajanik Vachala) () set up a Public library in the ancestral house of Shinde Family in village, with the thought of offering kids of village something which they had never experienced before. Although the initiative saw a mere participation initially, but the number tremendously rose to a regular visit of students in a year’s time. Setting up a library helped in achieving many things like students of different backgrounds come together to read, study and interact under the same roof. Library covers a vast range of books; newspapers, weekly and monthly magazines. The students and also villagers are free to read as per their choice.

Dams and irrigation projects

The village () has one dam named Kanher Dam. Almost all the villagers of Vele () donated their fertile agricultural land which they had owned for generations, for construction of Kanher Dam around 40 years ago (1970s). River on which this dam is built is the Venna River. The height of the dam above lowest foundation is 50.34 m (165.2 ft) while the length is 1,954 m (6,411 ft). The volume content is 6,308 km3 (1,513 cu mi) and gross storage capacity is 286,000.00 km3 (68,615.05 cu mi).

Agricultural and cropping pattern

Black cotton soil is the predominant soil type found here as is the case with most of the districts on the Deccan Plateau.

Major crops (irrigated) are rice, Cotton, Wheat, Gram, Sugarcane, Groundnut for 5 to 6 months (Except Sugar cane).

Major crops (non irrigated) are Bajra, Kharif and Rabi, Jowar, Groundnut for 3 to 4 months.

Notable people

Vele () is the birthplace of Indian film actor- Sayaji Shinde () who has acted in Telugu, Marathi, Hindi, Tamil, Kannada, and Malayalam films.
From early child Sayaji Shinde faced the challenges of life. Electricity reached this village as late as 1981.

Transport

Road

Vele () is located about 15 km from Satara, 122 km from Pune and around 270 km from Mumbai, the state capital. The nearest major city is Satara. Bus services by state-run MSRTC and private organizations connect Vele () by jeeps from Satara.
Medha and Mahabaleshwar are the nearby towns having good connectivity.

Rail

Satara railway station , Jarandeshwar Railway Station (near to Satara) are the railway stations reachable from Vele. However Pune Junction railway station is major railway station 135 km from here.

Nearby

Tourist places
 Kanher Dam - 4.7 km
 Satara - 15 km
 Ajinkyatara - 20 km
 Sajjangad - 29 km
 Kaas Plateau- 38 km, Called "Valley of flowers of Maharashtra" which is also a World Heritage Site
 Baramotichi Vihir- Stepwell near Limb village which is about 25 km from Vele
 Thoseghar Waterfalls - 39 km
 Mahableshwar - 49 km   
 Panchgani - 48 km
 Shri Chhatrapati Shivaji Maharaj Museum, Satara - 15 km
 Shri Bhavani Museum, Aundh, Satara - 57 km

Airports
 Pune Airport - 131 km
 Kolhapur Airport - 142 km
 Chhatrapati Shivaji Maharaj International Airport - 274 km

Colleges
 Yashwantrao Chavan Institute of Science college, Satara
 Karmaveer Bhaurao Patil College Of Engineering, Satara
 Government College of Engineering, Karad
 Chhatrapati Shivaji Arts College, Satara

Districts
 Satara  - 15 km
 Pune – 120 km

See also 
 History of Maharashtra
 Kanher Dam
 Shinde

References

Villages in Satara district